Pyrazine is a heterocyclic aromatic organic compound with the chemical formula C4H4N2. It is a symmetrical molecule with point group D2h. Pyrazine is less basic than pyridine, pyridazine and pyrimidine. It is a "deliquescent crystal or wax-like solid with a pungent, sweet, corn-like, nutty odour".

Pyrazine and a variety of alkylpyrazines are flavor and aroma compounds found in baked and roasted goods. Tetramethylpyrazine (also known as ligustrazine) is reported to scavenge superoxide anion and decrease nitric oxide production in human Granulocytes.

Synthesis 
Many methods exist for the organic synthesis of pyrazine and its derivatives. Some of these are among the oldest synthesis reactions still in use. 

In the Staedel–Rugheimer pyrazine synthesis (1876), 2-chloroacetophenone is reacted with ammonia to the amino ketone, then condensed and then oxidized to a pyrazine. A variation is the Gutknecht pyrazine synthesis (1879) also based on this  selfcondensation, but differing in the way the alpha-ketoamine is synthesised.

The Gastaldi synthesis (1921) is another variation:

See also 
 Alkylpyrazines
 Benzene, an analog without the nitrogen atoms
 Methoxypyrazines
 Pyridazine, an analog with the second nitrogen atom in position 2
 Pyridine, an analog with only one nitrogen atom
 Pyrimidine, an analog with the second nitrogen atom in position 3
 Simple aromatic rings

References

External links 
 Safety evaluation of food additives – pyrazine derivatives

 
Simple aromatic rings